The New York State Energy Research and Development Authority (NYSERDA), established in 1975, is a New York State public-benefit corporation, located in Albany, New York, with regional offices in New York City, Buffalo, and West Valley.

NYSERDA offers information and analysis, programs, technical expertise, and funding aimed at helping New Yorkers increase energy efficiency, save money, use renewable energy, and reduce their reliance on fossil fuels.  NYSERDA professionals are charged with protecting the environment and creating clean-energy jobs.  NYSERDA collaborates with businesses, industry, the federal government, academia, the environmental community, public interest groups, and energy market participants to reduce energy consumption and greenhouse gas emissions.

About NYSERDA

Responsibilities
Conducting a multifaceted energy and environmental research and development program to meet New York State's diverse economic needs.
Making energy more affordable for residential and low-income households.
Helping industries, schools, hospitals, municipalities, not-for-profits, and the residential sector, including low-income residents, implement energy efficiency measures.
Provide objective, credible, and useful energy analysis and planning to guide decisions made by major energy stakeholders in the private and public sectors.
Managing the Western New York Nuclear Service Center at West Valley, including: (1) overseeing the State's interests and share of costs at the West Valley Demonstration Project, a federal/State radioactive waste clean-up effort, and (2) managing wastes and maintaining facilities at the shut-down State Licensed Disposal Area.
Coordinating the State's activities on nuclear energy matters including the regulation of radioactive materials, and monitoring low-level radioactive waste generation and management in the State.
Financing energy-related projects, reducing costs for ratepayers.

Governance
The New York State Energy Research and Development Authority (NYSERDA) is governed by a 13-member Board appointed by the Governor with advice and consent of the New York Senate.
 
Richard Kauffman, Chairman of Energy and Finance for New York serves as Chair of NYSERDA. Doreen Harris serves as president and Chief Executive Officer and reports directly to the Board of Directors.
 
The Board oversees the development of the Authority's budget and program plan, and the processes, policies and procedures in which staff are to perform their duties in their efforts to fulfill NYSERDA's mission, and in the public's interest. The Commissioners of the Departments of Environmental Conservation and Transportation and the Chairs of the New York Power Authority and New York State Public Service Commission serve ex officio. Additional members must include: research scientist(s), economist(s), not-for-profit environmentalist(s), member(s) of a not-for-profit consumer group, officer(s) of a utility primarily engaged in the distribution of gas, officer(s) of an electric utility, and three public members.

In 2017, the Authority had operating expenses of $119.76 million, an outstanding debt of $2.654 billion, and a staffing level of 326 people.

History
NYSERDA is New York's energy agency. It provides analysis, programs, technical expertise, and funding to increase energy efficiency, use renewable energy, and reduce reliance on fossil fuels.

Emerging Authority
During the energy crisis of the 1970s, oil embargoes made the United States acutely aware that the world's petroleum supplies were finite. At first, the New York State Emergency Fuel Office was established under the aegis of Gov. Malcom Wilson and the Office of General Services.  In 1974, the New York State Legislature established a Special Joint Legislative Committee to examine petroleum distribution within the State. Chaired by Assemblyman Glenn H. Harris, it held hearings and met with major oil company and utility CEOs and relevant State agencies and authorities.  As a result, it produced a 1975-76 session omnibus program bill (A-6423/S-4400) to reorganize New York's energy regulatory and market framework.  In that bill, Raymond W. Hull, Jr. Executive Director, proposed a Department of Energy and an Energy Research and Development Authority, patterned after the Federal agency (ERDA) of the same description.  The originally proposed NYSERDA would have garnered funding from a small, dedicated tax on petroleum products and utility services sold in the state with the funding directed toward energy-efficiency research and development through the state's leading engineering and research colleges and universities.  

The bill was modified in the 1975 Legislative Session under the newly elected Democrat Assembly and Governor, and pared back to an energy Office and a utility-only funded NYSERDA.

NYSERDA's earliest efforts focused solely on research and development of renewable energy technologies with the goal of reducing New York State's petroleum consumption. NYSERDA was created as a public benefit corporation in 1975 under Article 8, Title 9 and Title 9A of the State Public Authorities Law through the reconstitution of the New York State Atomic and Space Development Authority. In the 1980s, lines disappeared at gas stations but concerns about energy's impact on the environment would continue. Separate from NYSERDA during that time, the New York State Energy Office handled energy policy analysis and energy efficiency audits. Funding was derived primarily from federal grants and monies distributed via the Petroleum Overcharge Restitution Fund.

When the Energy Office was closed in 1995, NYSERDA took on critical energy efficiency, energy assessments, energy planning, and policy analysis functions. The national recession in the 1990s emphasized the need to help New York State residents and businesses increase energy efficiency in order to save money. Simultaneous global events highlighted the need for energy security and less reliance on foreign sources of oil, and signaled a renewed need for increased focus on protecting the environment.

In Transition
NYSERDA's funding structure changed in 1998 when the New York State Public Service Commission approved the ratepayer-supported System Benefits Charge (SBC) Program and designated NYSERDA as the program's administrator. The SBC is collected by investor-owned utilities from gas and electric customers in the State, and funds the majority of NYSERDA's programs. The Public Service Commission also established in 1998 the nationally recognized, long-running New York Energy $mart Program to continue public benefit research and development, energy services, and environmental programs that may not have otherwise happened as New York State moved to a competitive electric utility industry.

In the new millennium, NYSERDA became involved in green buildings while new kinds of energy crises made headlines. In 2000 and 2001, California's electricity crisis, rolling blackouts, and energy market manipulations in 2000 and 2001 highlighted how dependent the nation was on the electric grid. The 2002 New York State Energy Plan then noted possible consequences of New York State's heavy dependence on fossil fuel, which is largely imported from abroad or out-of-state. In response, NYSERDA took steps toward a proactive approach for New York State's energy future.

Leading Change
As renewable energy was becoming popular in other parts of the country, New York State wanted to make it attractive to the State's residents and businesses. Between 2004 and 2008, the Public Service Commission approved two new programs related to funding renewable energy and energy efficiency as NYSERDA pursued a market-driven approach to doing business including creating effective partnerships among private industry, government, and academia that benefit all New Yorkers. In 2004, the Renewable Portfolio Standard (RPS) was established with the goal of increasing the proportion of renewable energy used by New Yorkers. In 2008, the Energy Efficiency Portfolio Standard(EEPS) was created with a specific directive: reduce electricity usage in New York.

New York State also took pioneering steps in 2008 to address greenhouse gas emissions related to energy. New York became a charter member of a cooperative effort by nine Northeast and Mid-Atlantic states called the Regional Greenhouse Gas Initiative (RGGI). RGGI is the first mandatory, market-based effort to limit greenhouse gas emissions in the United States. Proceeds from auction and trading of carbon dioxide allowances help fund some of NYSERDA's programs.

As the national economy began a downturn in 2008, New Yorkers struggled too. NYSERDA worked toward sustainability goals, supporting the U.S. Department of Energy's Energy Frontier Research Centers Program and focusing on the 4 E's: energy, environment, economy, and education.

Establishing a Clean Energy Economy

By 2010, NYSERDA programs focused on reducing energy use, increasing energy efficiency, creating jobs, "creating public-private partnerships to stimulate entrepreneurial spirit", and "preparing tomorrow's workforce to excel in the clean energy economy". To reinforce this focus, the Public Service Commission approved funding for the Technology and Market Development Program in 2011.

In 2014, NY Green Bank, a state-sponsored, specialized financial entity and a division of NYSERDA, opened for business to increase private investment in renewable energy and energy efficiency projects, which have had difficulty accessing financing. Announced by Governor Andrew M. Cuomo in his 2013 State of the State address, the development of a Green Bank in New York aimed at facilitating more reliable, more efficient energy, and reduced greenhouse gas emissions.

The Saratoga Technology + Energy Park (STEP) is a 280-acre site in Malta, New York focused on clean energy. The site is approved for 1.25 million square feet of office, research and development, and light manufacturing, along with 77% green space.

The New York Truck Voucher Incentive Program (NYTVIP), provides vouchers, or discounts, to fleets across New York State that purchase or lease medium- and heavy-duty zero-emission battery-electric vehicles (BEV). Administered by the New York State Energy Research and Development Authority (NYSERDA), NYTVIP helps make it easier for fleets to adopt zero-emission vehicle technologies by significantly reducing upfront costs.

See also 
 Long Island Power Authority
 New York energy law

References

External links

1975 establishments in New York (state)
Public benefit corporations in New York (state)
Economy of New York (state)
United States energy law
Energy policy of the United States
Environmental agencies in New York (state)